Sublette Township is located in Lee County, Illinois. As of the 2010 census, its population was 776 and it contained 373 housing units. Sublette Township was originally named Hanno Township, but it was renamed at an unknown date. The village of Sublette is located within the township.

Geography

Demographics

References

External links
 US Census
 City-data.com
 Illinois State Archives

Townships in Lee County, Illinois
Townships in Illinois